National Highway 9 (NH 9) is a National Highway in India in east-west direction. It starts at Malout in Punjab and ends at Pithoragarh in Pithoragarh district in Uttarakhand. It passes through the states of Punjab, Haryana, Delhi, Uttar Pradesh and Uttarakhand. After renumbering of all national highways by National Highway Authority of India in 2010, the current NH 9 was formed by merging segments of five separate national highways in 2010; these were Old NH 10 (Fazilka-Delhi section), Old NH 24 (Delhi-Rampur section),  Old NH 87 (Rampur-Rudrapur section), Old NH 74 (Rudrapur-Sitarganj-Khatima section) and Old NH 125 (Tanakpur-Pithoragarh section).

Route
Starting at Malout in Punjab and ending at Askot in the State of Uttarakhand, it passes connects several important cities in five states in North India (from west towards east):
 Punjab 
 Malout
 Haryana
 Sirsa-Fatehabad-Hisar-Hansi-Maham-Rohtak-Bahadurgarh
 Delhi
 Uttar Pradesh 
 Ghaziabad-Hapur-Moradabad-Rampur
 Uttarakhand 
 Rudrapur-Kichha-Sitarganj-Khatima-Tanakpur-Pithoragarh-Ogla-Askot

Map with spur routes

See also
 List of National Highways in India
 List of National Highways in India by state

Gallery

References

External links
NH 9 on OpenStreetMap

National highways in India
National Highways in Haryana